A ratio distribution (also known as a quotient distribution) is a probability distribution constructed as the distribution of the ratio of random variables having two other known distributions.
Given two (usually independent) random variables X and Y, the distribution of the random variable Z that is formed as the ratio Z = X/Y is a ratio distribution.

An example is the Cauchy distribution (also called the normal ratio distribution), which comes about as the ratio of two normally distributed variables with zero mean.
Two other distributions often used in test-statistics are also ratio distributions: 
the t-distribution arises from a Gaussian random variable divided by an independent chi-distributed random variable, 
while the F-distribution originates from the ratio of two independent chi-squared distributed random variables.
More general ratio distributions have been considered in the literature.

Often the ratio distributions are heavy-tailed, and it may be difficult to work with such distributions and develop an associated statistical test.
A method based on the median has been suggested as a "work-around".

Algebra of random variables

The ratio is one type of algebra for random variables:
Related to the ratio distribution are the product distribution, sum distribution and difference distribution. More generally, one may talk of combinations of sums, differences, products and ratios.
Many of these distributions are described in Melvin D. Springer's book from 1979 The Algebra of Random Variables.

The algebraic rules known with ordinary numbers do not apply for the algebra of random variables.
For example, if a product is C = AB and a ratio is D=C/A it does not necessarily mean that the distributions of D and B are the same. 
Indeed, a peculiar effect is seen for the Cauchy distribution: The product and the ratio of two independent Cauchy distributions (with the same scale parameter and the location parameter set to zero) will give the same distribution.
This becomes evident when regarding the Cauchy distribution as itself a ratio distribution of two Gaussian distributions of zero means: Consider two Cauchy random variables,  and  each constructed from two Gaussian distributions  and  then

 

where . The first term is the ratio of two Cauchy distributions while the last term is the product of two such distributions.

Derivation

 

If the two variables are independent then   and this becomes

 

This may not be straightforward.  By way of example take the classical problem of the ratio of two standard Gaussian samples.  The joint pdf is

Defining  we have

Using the known definite integral    we get

which is the Cauchy distribution, or Student's t distribution with n = 1

The Mellin transform has also been suggested for derivation of ratio distributions.

In the case of positive independent variables, proceed as follows. The diagram shows a separable bivariate distribution  which has support in the positive quadrant  and we wish to find the pdf of the ratio .  The hatched volume above the line  represents the cumulative distribution of the function  multiplied with the logical function .  The density is first integrated in horizontal strips; the horizontal strip at height y extends from x = 0 to x = Ry and has incremental probability .
Secondly, integrating the horizontal strips upward over all y yields the volume of probability above the line

Move the differentiation inside the integral:

and since
 
then

As an example, find the pdf of the ratio R when
 

We have

thus

Differentiation wrt. R yields the pdf of R

Moments of random ratios

From Mellin transform theory, for distributions existing only on the positive half-line , we have the product identity  provided  are independent. For the case of a ratio of samples like , in order to make use of this identity it is necessary to use moments of the inverse distribution. Set  such that .
At simplest, .

To illustrate, let  be sampled from a standard Gamma distribution

is sampled from an inverse Gamma distribution with parameter  and has pdf .  The moments of this pdf are 

Multiplying the corresponding moments gives

Independently, it is known that the ratio of the two Gamma samples  follows the Beta Prime distribution: 
 whose moments are 

Substituting   we have

which is consistent with the product of moments above.

Means and variances of random ratios
In the Product distribution section, and derived from Mellin transform theory (see section above), it is found that the mean of a product of independent variables is equal to the product of their means.  In the case of ratios, we have

which, in terms of probability distributions, is equivalent to

 

Note that  i.e., 

The variance of a ratio of independent variables is

Normal ratio distributions

Uncorrelated central normal ratio
When X and Y are independent and have a Gaussian distribution with zero mean, the form of their ratio distribution is a Cauchy distribution.
This can be derived by setting   then showing that  has circular symmetry. For a bivariate uncorrelated Gaussian distribution we have 
 

 
We have, by conservation of probability
 
and since 
 
and setting   we get
 
There is a spurious factor of 2 here.  Actually, two values of  spaced by  map onto the same value of z, the density is doubled, and the final result is
 

When either of the two Normal distributions is non-central then the result for the distribution of the ratio is much more complicated and is given below in the succinct form presented by David Hinkley.  The trigonometric method for a ratio does however extend to radial distributions like bivariate normals or a bivariate Student t in which the density depends only on radius .  It does not extend to the ratio of two independent Student t distributions which give the Cauchy ratio shown in a section below for one degree of freedom.

Uncorrelated noncentral normal ratio

In the absence of correlation , the probability density function of the two normal variables X = N(μX, σX2) and Y = N(μY, σY2) ratio Z = X/Y is given exactly by the following expression, derived in several sources:

 

where

 
 
 
 
 

Under certain conditions, a normal approximation is possible, with variance:

Correlated central normal ratio

The above expression becomes more complicated when the variables X and Y are correlated. If  but  and  the more general Cauchy distribution is obtained

 

where ρ is the correlation coefficient between X and Y and
 
 

The complex distribution has also been expressed with Kummer's confluent hypergeometric function or the Hermite function.

Correlated noncentral normal ratio

Approximations to correlated noncentral normal ratio

A transformation to the log domain was suggested by Katz(1978) (see binomial section below).  Let the ratio be
.

Take logs to get

Since  then asymptotically 

Alternatively, Geary (1930) suggested that
 
has approximately  a standard Gaussian distribution:
This transformation has been called the Geary–Hinkley transformation; the approximation is good if Y is unlikely to assume negative values, basically .

Exact correlated noncentral normal ratio

Geary showed how the correlated ratio  could be transformed into a near-Gaussian form and developed an approximation for  dependent on the probability of negative denominator values  being vanishingly small.  Fieller's later correlated ratio analysis is exact but care is needed when used with modern math packages and similar problems may occur in some of Marsaglia's equations.  Pham-Ghia has exhaustively discussed these methods.  Hinkley's correlated results are exact but it is shown below that the correlated ratio condition can be transformed simply into an uncorrelated one so only the simplified Hinkley equations above are required, not the full correlated ratio version.

Let the ratio be:

Write  such that  become uncorrelated and  has standard deviation

The ratio:

is invariant under this transformation and retains the same pdf.
The  term in the numerator is made separable by expanding:

to get

The theoretical distribution, derived from the equations under discussion combined with Hinkley's equations, is highly consistent with a simulation result using 5,000 samples. In the top figure it is easily understood that for a ratio  the wedge almost bypasses the distribution mass altogether and this coincides with a near-zero region in the theoretical pdf. Conversely as  reduces toward zero the line collects a higher probability.

This transformation will be recognized as being the same as that used by Geary (1932) as a partial result in his eqn viii  but whose derivation and limitations were hardly explained. Thus the first part of Geary's transformation to approximate Gaussianity in the previous section is actually exact and not dependent on the positivity of Y.  The offset result is also consistent with the "Cauchy" correlated zero-mean Gaussian ratio distribution in the first section. Marsaglia has applied the same result but using a nonlinear method to achieve it.

Complex normal ratio
The ratio of correlated zero-mean circularly symmetric complex normal distributed variables was determined by Baxley et al.  The joint distribution of x, y is

where

 is an Hermitian transpose and

In the usual event that  we get

Further closed-form results for the CDF are also given.

The pdf peak occurs at roughly the complex conjugate of a scaled down .

Ratio of log-normal  

The ratio of independent or correlated log-normals is log-normal. If they are independent or their logarithms follow a bivarate normal distribution, then the logarithm of their ratio is the difference of independent or correlated normally distributed random variables, which is normally distributed.

This is a common result of the multiplicative central limit theorem, also known as Gibrat's law, when  is the result of an accumulation of many small percentage changes and must be positive and approximately log-normally distributed.

Uniform ratio distribution
With two independent random variables following a uniform distribution, e.g., 
 
the ratio distribution becomes

Cauchy ratio distribution
If two independent random variables, X and Y each follow a Cauchy distribution with median equal to zero and shape factor 
 
then the ratio distribution for the random variable  is
 
The ratio distribution is similar to but not the same as the product distribution of the random variable :
 
More generally, if two independent random variables X and Y each follow a Cauchy distribution with median equal to zero and shape factor  and  respectively, then:
 The ratio distribution for the random variable  is 
 The product distribution for the random variable  is 
The result for the ratio distribution can be obtained from the product distribution by replacing  with

Ratio of standard normal to standard uniform

If X has a standard normal distribution and Y has a standard uniform distribution, then Z = X / Y has a distribution known as the slash distribution, with probability density function

where φ(z) is the probability density function of the standard normal distribution.

Chi-squared, Gamma, Beta distributions

Then

    the Student's t distribution
    i.e. Fisher's F-test distribution
  the beta distribution
  the standard beta prime distribution

 , a noncentral F-distribution.

 
defines , Fisher's F density distribution, the PDF of the ratio of two Chi-squares with m, n degrees of freedom.

The CDF of the Fisher density, found in F-tables is defined in the beta prime distribution article. 
If we enter an F-test table with m = 3, n = 4 and 5% probability in the right tail, the critical value is found to be 6.59.  This coincides with the integral
 

For gamma distributions U and V with arbitrary shape parameters α1 and α2 and their scale parameters both set to unity, that is, where , then

 

  

  

If , then .  Note that here θ is a scale parameter, rather than a rate parameter.

If  , then by rescaling the  parameter to unity we have

 

 
Thus  
 
in which  represents the generalised beta prime distribution.

In the foregoing it is apparent that if  then .  More explicitly, since
 
if  
then

where

Rayleigh Distributions

If  X, Y are independent samples from the Rayleigh distribution , the ratio Z = X/Y follows the distribution

and has cdf

The Rayleigh distribution has scaling as its only parameter.  The distribution of  follows

and has cdf

Fractional gamma distributions (including chi, chi-squared, exponential, Rayleigh and Weibull) 

The generalized gamma distribution is

 

which includes the regular gamma, chi, chi-squared, exponential, Rayleigh, Nakagami and Weibull distributions involving fractional powers.  Note that here a is a scale parameter, rather than a rate parameter;  d is a shape parameter.

 If 
 then 
where

Modelling a mixture of different scaling factors

In the ratios above, Gamma samples, U, V may have differing sample sizes  but must be drawn from the same distribution  with equal scaling .

In situations where U and V are differently scaled, a variables transformation allows the modified random ratio pdf to be determined. Let  where  arbitrary and, from above, .

Rescale V arbitrarily, defining 

We have  and substitution into Y gives 

Transforming X to Y gives 

Noting   we finally have
 

Thus, if  and 

The distribution of Y is limited here to the interval [0,1].  It can be generalized by scaling such that if   then

 

where  
  is then a sample from

Reciprocals of samples from beta distributions

Though not ratio distributions of two variables, the following identities for one variable are useful:

 If  then 
 If  then 
combining the latter two equations yields
 If  then .

 If  then 
since 

then
 ,  the distribution of the reciprocals of   samples.
If  then  and
  

Further results can be found in the Inverse distribution article.

 If   are independent exponential random variables with mean μ, then X − Y is a double exponential random variable with mean 0 and scale μ.

Binomial distribution

This result was first derived by Katz et al. in 1978.

Suppose X ~ Binomial(n,p1) and Y ~ Binomial(m,p2) and X, Y are independent. Let T = (X/n)/(Y/m).

Then log(T) is approximately normally distributed with mean log(p1/p2) and variance ((1/p1) − 1)/n + ((1/p2) − 1)/m.

The binomial ratio distribution is of significance in clinical trials: if the distribution of T is known as above, the probability of a given ratio arising purely by chance can be estimated, i.e. a false positive trial.  A number of papers compare the robustness of different approximations for the binomial ratio.

Poisson and truncated Poisson distributions

In the ratio of Poisson variables R = X/Y there is a problem that Y is zero with finite probability so R is undefined.  To counter this, we consider the truncated, or censored, ratio R' = X/Y where zero sample of Y are discounted.  Moreover, in many medical-type surveys, there are systematic problems with the reliability of the zero samples of both X and Y and it may be good practice to ignore the zero samples anyway.

The probability of a null Poisson sample being , the generic pdf of a left truncated Poisson distribution is 

which sums to unity. Following Cohen, for n independent trials, the multidimensional truncated pdf is

and the log likelihood becomes

On differentiation we get

and setting to zero gives the maximum likelihood estimate 

Note that as  then  so the truncated maximum likelihood  estimate, though correct for both truncated and untruncated distributions, gives a truncated mean  value which is highly biassed relative to the untruncated one. Nevertheless it appears that  is a sufficient statistic for  since  depends on the data only through the sample mean  in the previous equation which is consistent with the methodology of the conventional Poisson distribution.

Absent any closed form solutions, the following approximate reversion for truncated  is valid over the whole range .

which compares with the non-truncated version which is simply .  Taking the ratio  is a valid operation even though  may use a non-truncated model while  has a left-truncated one.

The asymptotic large- (and Cramér–Rao bound) is 

in which substituting L gives 

Then substituting  from the equation above, we get Cohen's variance estimate

The variance of the point estimate of the mean , on the basis of n trials, decreases asymptotically to zero as n increases to infinity. For small  it diverges from the truncated pdf variance in Springael for example, who quotes a variance of 

for n samples in the left-truncated pdf shown at the top of this section.  Cohen showed that the variance of the estimate relative to the variance of the pdf, ranges from 1 for large  (100% efficient) up to 2 as  approaches zero (50% efficient).

These mean and variance parameter estimates, together with parallel estimates for X, can be applied to Normal or Binomial approximations for the Poisson ratio.  Samples from trials may not be a good fit for the Poisson process; a further discussion of Poisson truncation is by Dietz and Bohning and there is a Zero-truncated Poisson distribution Wikipedia entry.

Double Lomax distribution

This distribution is the ratio of two Laplace distributions. Let X and Y be standard Laplace identically distributed random variables and let z = X / Y. Then the probability distribution of z is

 

Let the mean of the X and Y be a. Then the standard double Lomax distribution is symmetric around a.

This distribution has an infinite mean and variance.

If Z has a standard double Lomax distribution, then 1/Z also has a standard double Lomax distribution.

The standard Lomax distribution is unimodal and has heavier tails than the Laplace distribution.

For 0 < a < 1, the a-th moment exists.

 

where Γ is the gamma function.

 Ratio distributions in multivariate analysis 
Ratio distributions also appear in multivariate analysis. If the random matrices X and Y follow a Wishart distribution then the ratio of the determinants

 

is proportional to the product of independent F random variables. In the case where X and Y''' are from independent standardized Wishart distributions then the ratio 
 
has a Wilks' lambda distribution.

Ratios of Quadratic Forms involving Wishart Matrices
Probability distribution can be derived from random quadratic forms

If A is the inverse of another matrix B then  is a random ratio in some sense, frequently arising in Least Squares estimation problems.

In the Gaussian case if A is a matrix drawn from a complex Wishart distribution  of dimensionality p x p and k degrees of freedom with  while  is an arbitrary complex vector with Hermitian (conjugate) transpose , the ratio

follows the Gamma distribution

 

The result arises in least squares adaptive Wiener filtering - see eqn(A13) of.

Similarly, for full-rank (  zero-mean real-valued Wishart matrix samples
, and V a random vector independent of W'', the ratio

This result is usually attributed to Muirhead (1982).

Given complex Wishart matrix , the ratio

follows the Beta distribution (see eqn(47) of)

 

The result arises in the performance analysis of constrained least squares filtering and derives from a more complex but ultimately equivalent ratio that if  then

In its simplest form, if  and  then the ratio of the (1,1) inverse element squared to the sum of modulus squares of the whole top row elements has distribution

See also
Relationships among probability distributions
Inverse distribution (also known as reciprocal distribution)
Product distribution
Ratio estimator
Slash distribution

Notes

References

External links
Ratio Distribution at MathWorld
Normal Ratio Distribution at MathWorld
Ratio Distributions at MathPages

Algebra of random variables
Statistical ratios
Types of probability distributions